The Nyabarongo II Multipurpose Dam, is a multipurpose dam under construction across the Nyabarongo River in Rwanda. The reservoir is also expected to provide irrigation water to an estimated  of land, downstream of the dam site. In addition, the dam will host Nyabarongo II Hydroelectric Power Station, with installed generating capacity of 43.5 megawatts.

Location
Nyabarongo II Dam is located near the town of Shyorongi, in Rulindo District, in the Northern Province of Rwanda.

History
In June 2018, the government of Rwanda, through Energy Development Corporation Limited (EDCL), a subsidiary of Rwanda Energy Group (REG), agreed with Sinohydro for the latter to build this multipurpose dam to (a) store irrigation water (b) to regulate flooding downstream of this dam and (c) generate 43.5 megawatts of hydroelectric energy to add to the national grid.

In April 2019, the agreements between the parties were clarified. Sinohydro was tasked to build the dam and have the components working, no later than 2025. The building model to be used was agreed to be "build, own, operate and transfer" (BOOT). The cost of the project was budgeted at $214 million.

Nyabarongo II Power Station is intended to augment the  Nyabarongo I Hydroelectric Power Station, upstream of Nyabarongo II.

Development, funding and timeline
The engineering, procurement, and construction contract was awarded to Sinohydro, the Chinese state-owned hydropower, engineering and construction company, at a contract price of US$214 million.

The funds were borrowed by the Government of Rwanda, from the Exim Bank of China on concessional terms.

Construction began in April 2021 and is scheduled to last until December 2025.

Associated infrastructure
All that to be completed in 56 months.

See also
 List of power stations in Rwanda

References

External links

 Rwanda to receive US $214m for Nyabarongo II Dam project As of 19 February 2020.

Northern Province, Rwanda
Rulindo District
Dams under construction
Hydroelectric power stations in Rwanda